Events from the year 1915 in art.

Events
 May – Ambrose Heal and others found the Design and Industries Association in London.
 c. May – Publication of the first modern book illustrated with wood engravings, Frances Cornford's Spring Morning (published by The Poetry Bookshop, London) with engravings by the poet's cousin Gwen Raverat.
 June 10 – The only contemporary Vorticist exhibition staged opens at the Doré Gallery in London.
 October 24 – Giovanni Battista Tiepolo's frescos, Translation of the House of Loreto, in the Church of the Scalzi (Venice) are destroyed by an Austrian bombardment.
 December 19 – Kasimir Malevich stages the 0.10 Exhibition and originates Suprematism.
 Pierre Bodard serves with the French Army on Martinique.
 Harper's Bazaar hires Erté to design its covers.
 Edward McKnight Kauffer is given his first commission to design a poster for the Underground Electric Railways Company of London.
 Shōzaburō Watanabe originates shin-hanga collaborative woodblock printing in Japan.
 The first of the 'Etruscan terracotta warriors', forged by sculptor Alfredo Fioravanti with the Riccardi family, is purchased by the Metropolitan Museum of Art in New York City.
 14-year-old Alice Prin ("Kiki de Montparnasse") is posing (nude) for sculptors in Paris.

Works

 George Bellows – Riverfront No. 1
 Frank Weston Benson – Red and Gold
 Umberto Boccioni
 Charge of the Lancers
 Horizontal Volumes
 Marc Chagall – The Poet Reclining
 William Merritt Chase – Self-portrait
 Giorgio de Chirico – The Double Dream of Spring
 Marcel Duchamp – begins producing readymades
 Jacob Epstein – bust of Admiral Lord Fisher
 J. W. Godward – In The Prime Of The Summer Time
 Alexandre Jacovleff – The Violinist
 Eric Kennington - The Kensingtons at Laventie
 Ernst Ludwig Kirchner
 Brandenburger Tor
 Self-portrait as a Soldier
 Carl Larsson – Midvinterblot
 Wyndham Lewis – The Crowd
 Kazimir Malevich – Black Square
 Henri Matisse – Le rideau jaune
 Jean Metzinger – Soldier at a Game of Chess
 Piet Mondrian – Composition No. 10 Pier and Ocean
 C. R. W. Nevinson
 Bursting Shell
 La Mitrailleuse
 Returning to the Trenches (approximate date)
 Diego Rivera – cubist portrait of Ramón Gómez de la Serna
 Isaac Rosenberg – Self-portrait
 Ladislav Šaloun – Jan Hus Memorial (Prague)
 Helene Schjerfbeck – Self-portrait with black background
 Kathleen Scott – statue of her late husband Robert Falcon Scott
 Zinaida Serebriakova
 Harvest
 Peasants
 Fred Spear – Enlist (poster)
Stewart–Screven Monument
 Paul Strand – Wall Street (photograph)
 W. L. Wyllie – The track of Lusitania: view of casualties and survivors in the water and in lifeboats
 Konstantin Yuon – March Sun
 Anders Zorn – Self-portrait in Red

Births
 January 3 – Jack Levine, American Social Realist painter and printmaker (d. 2010)
 January 15 – Leo Mol, Ukrainian-born Canadian artist, sculptor (d. 2009)
 January 24 – Robert Motherwell, American abstract expressionist painter and printmaker (d. 1991).
 February 4 – Virginia Admiral, American painter and poet (d. 2000)
 February 11 – Mervyn Levy, Welsh artist and critic (d. 1996).
 March 10 – Harry Bertoia, Italian-born American artist and furniture designer (d. 1978).
 March 19 – Maria Austria (née Marie Karoline Oeststreicher) Austro-Dutch photographer and photojournalist)
 April 4 – Louis Archambault, Canadian sculptor (d. 2003).
 April 6 – Tadeusz Kantor, Polish painter, Assemblage artist, set designer and theatre director (d. 1990)
 April 10 – Wynona Mulcaster, Canadian painter and teacher (d. 2016)
 April 15 – Elizabeth Catlett, African-American graphic artist and sculptor (d. 2012)
 April 17 – William Pachner, Czech painter (d. 2017)
 May 3 – Richard Lippold, American sculptor (d. 2002)
 May 20 – Sam Golden, American paint maker (d. 1997)
 May 31 – Carmen Herrera, Cuban-American abstract minimalist visual artist
 June 7 – Graham Ingels, American illustrator (d. 1991)
 June 11 – José Caballero, Spanish artist (d. 1991)
 June 17 – Gunther Gerzso, Mexican abstract painter (d. 2000)
 June 23 – Frances Gabe, American artist and inventor (d. 2016)
 July 8 – Malvina Cheek, British artist (d. 2016)
 July 15
 Edith Pfau, American painter, sculptor and art educator (d. 2001) 
 Judith Révész, Hungarian-Dutch potter and sculptor (d. 2018) 
 July 19 – Åke Hellman, Finnish still life and portrait painter (d. 2017)
 July 28 – Dick Sprang, American comic book artist (d. 2000)
 August 14 – Mary Fedden, English painter (d. 2012)
 August 28
 Patrick Hennessy, Irish painter (d. 1980)
 Tasha Tudor, American illustrator and author of children's books (d. 2008)
 September 17 – M. F. Husain, Indian artist (d. 2011)
 September 19 – Duffy Ayers, born Betty FitzGerald, English portrait painter (d. 2017)
 October 13
 Terry Frost, English Abstract artist (d. 2003)
 Ricco, Swiss painter (d. 1972)
 October 24 – Bob Kane, American comic book artist and writer (d. 1998)
 November 9 – André François, French cartoonist (d. 2005)
 November 26 – Inge King, German-born Australian sculptor (d. 2016)
 November 28 – Evald Okas, Estonian painter (d. 2011)

Deaths
 January 15 – Luigi Crosio, Italian painter (b. 1835)
 January 23 – Anne Whitney, American sculptor, poet (b. 1821)
 February 25 – Flaxman Charles John Spurrell, English archaeologist and photographer (b. 1842)
 April 3 – Nadežda Petrović, Serbian Fauvist painter (b. 1873)
 April 9 – Karl Bitter, Austrian American sculptor (b. 1867)
 May 7 – Sir Hugh Lane, Irish-born art dealer, collector and benefactor (b. 1875; killed in sinking of the RMS Lusitania)
 June 5 – Henri Gaudier-Brzeska, French artist and sculptor (killed in action) (b. 1891)
 June 7 – Hilda Sjölin, Swedish photographer (b. 1835)
 July 10 – Hendrik Willem Mesdag, Dutch marine painter (b. 1831)
 July 11 – Albert Schickedanz, Austro-Hungarian architect and painter in the Eclectic style (b. 1846)
 September 11 – Jens Birkholm, Danish genre and landscape painter (b. 1869)
 September 14 – Alfred Agache, French academic painter (b. 1843)
 October 24 – Désiré Charnay, French archaeologist and pioneer photographer (b. 1828)
 November 28 – Kobayashi Kiyochika, Japanese ukiyo-e painter and printmaker (b. 1847)
 December 22 – Arthur Hughes, English painter and illustrator (b. 1832)
 date unknown
 Kikuchi Shingaku, Japanese photographer (b. 1832)
 Krikor Torosian, Armenian illustrator (b. 1884; killed in Armenian genocide)

References

 
Years of the 20th century in art
1910s in art